The North Dakota Department of Transportation (NDDOT) is a part of the government of the U.S. state of North Dakota. NDDOT oversees the state's transportation system. This includes planning both new construction and reconstruction projects on roads and highways throughout the state. NDDOT is also responsible for the issuance of state driver's licenses.

North Dakota, despite its small population, has the distinction of having a transportation system that has more miles of road per capita than any other state in the United States. North Dakota has the second smallest Department of Transportation within the country (second only to Hawaii).  Despite the small size of the Department, North Dakota has more registered vehicles than there are residents of the state.

The Director is Bill Panos, and the central office is located on the North Dakota State Capitol grounds in Bismarck, North Dakota. Until the 1990s, the agency was known as the North Dakota Highway Department.

References

External links 
 North Dakota Department of Transportation website

Transportation in North Dakota
State departments of transportation of the United States
Motor vehicle registration agencies
State agencies of North Dakota